Platymiscium filipes is a species of flowering plant belonging to the family Fabaceae.

Its native range is French Guiana to Northern Brazil.

References

Dalbergieae